The Bryan House No. 2 is a historic duplex house at 321 East Locust Street in Rogers, Arkansas, United States.  It is a single-story double pen frame structure, with a side gable roof.  A one-story ell extends to the rear on one side.  A porch with turned columns extends the full width of the structure, sheltering the two main entrances.  Built c. 1900, this is the best-preserved of a modest number of surviving houses of this type in Rogers, which were once much more numerous.

The house was listed on the National Register of Historic Places  in 1988.

See also
National Register of Historic Places listings in Benton County, Arkansas

References

Houses on the National Register of Historic Places in Arkansas
Houses completed in 1900
Houses in Rogers, Arkansas
National Register of Historic Places in Benton County, Arkansas